Anișoara Dobre-Bălan ( Bălan; born 1 July 1966) is a Romanian rower. Competing in quadruple sculls she won two Olympic medals, in 1988 and 1992, and three world championship medals, in 1985, 1986 and 1991. She also won the world title in women's eight in 1989. Her sister Doina Șnep-Bălan is married to Ioan Snep; both are Olympic rowers. The sisters often competed at the same tournament but in different crews.

References

External links
 
 
 
 

1966 births
Living people
People from Liteni
Romanian female rowers
Rowers at the 1988 Summer Olympics
Rowers at the 1992 Summer Olympics
Olympic bronze medalists for Romania
Olympic silver medalists for Romania
Olympic rowers of Romania
Olympic medalists in rowing
World Rowing Championships medalists for Romania
Medalists at the 1992 Summer Olympics
Medalists at the 1988 Summer Olympics